This is a list of botanical gardens in Germany. This list is intended to contain all significant botanical gardens and arboreta in Germany.

List

See also

 List of botanical gardens

References
 Zentralregister biologischer Forschungssammlungen in Deutschland
 Convention on Biological Diversity: Germany
 thegardener.ch: Botanical gardens in Germany

External links

!
!
Germany
Botanical gardens